Frastanz is a market town in the district of Feldkirch in the westernmost Austrian state of Vorarlberg. In former times it was known for its production of tobacco.

Geography
Frastanz is located 510 meters above sea level. It is 32.25 km2 in area. 61.2% of the area are wooded.

History
In ancient times, Frastanz was situated on a Roman Road. It was also the site of the Battle of Frastanz in 1499.

Population

Politics
The local council consists of 27 members, with representatives of five political parties: The Austrian People's Party, the Green Party, the Freedom Party of Austria, the Social Democratic Party of Austria, and the Free Citizens' List. The current mayor is Walter Gohm.

References

External links
 Official Website

Cities and towns in Feldkirch District